Turley is a census-designated place (CDP) in Tulsa County, Oklahoma, United States. The population was 2,756 at the 2010 census, a loss of 14.7 percent from the figure of 3,231 recorded in 2000.

History
Turley was historically known as Flat Rock. The community was established around 1897, and the first school was established there in 1902. The post office was located in Jim Turley's and S.L. Daun's store. The store and the blacksmith shop comprised the first town of Turley, which was located northeast of 66th Street North and Peoria Avenue.

Geography
Turley is located at  (36.247627, -95.970378).

Demographics

As of the census of 2000, there were 3,231 people, 1,253 households, and 859 families residing in the CDP. The population density was 873.0 people per square mile (337.2/km2). There were 1,449 housing units at an average density of 391.5/sq mi (151.2/km2). The racial makeup of the CDP was 66.95% White, 14.39% African American, 11.05% Native American, 0.37% Asian, 0.03% Pacific Islander, 0.84% from other races, and 6.38% from two or more races. Hispanic or Latino of any race were 3.81% of the population.

There were 1,253 households, out of which 29.4% had children under the age of 18 living with them, 48.4% were married couples living together, 13.6% had a female householder with no husband present, and 31.4% were non-families. 25.5% of all households were made up of individuals, and 9.8% had someone living alone who was 65 years of age or older. The average household size was 2.58 and the average family size was 3.10.

In the CDP, the population was spread out, with 26.3% under the age of 18, 8.7% from 18 to 24, 28.3% from 25 to 44, 23.1% from 45 to 64, and 13.6% who were 65 years of age or older. The median age was 36 years. For every 100 females, there were 97.9 males. For every 100 females age 18 and over, there were 96.7 males.

The median income for a household in the CDP was $28,779, and the median income for a family was $31,573. Males had a median income of $27,484 versus $22,400 for females. The per capita income for the CDP was $16,325. About 11.1% of families and 11.7% of the population were below the poverty line, including 11.1% of those under age 18 and 10.3% of those age 65 or over.

References

External links
 Turley Oklahoma Historical Association. Retrieved January 15, 2013.

Census-designated places in Tulsa County, Oklahoma
Census-designated places in Oklahoma